David Ensor may refer to:

 David Ensor (politician) (1906–1987), British actor and Labour Party politician, Member of Parliament for Bury and Radcliffe 1964–1970 
 David Ensor (journalist), Group Exec. Vice President for Communications at Mercuria Energy Group. Former security correspondent for CNN